Brucella agar is a form of agar used to culture species of Brucella and Campylobacter jejuni

References

Microbiological media